The Ermita de San Antonio de Padua ("Chapel of St. Anthony of Padua") is a chapel located on the slopes of Monte Hacho in Ceuta, one of Spain's cities in the North of Africa.

It was originally built in the 17th century by the Portuguese, but was extensively renovated and reconstructed in the 1960s. A festival is held at the hermitage every June 13 to mark Saint Anthony's Day.

References
Hardy, P., Vorhees, M., and Edsall, H. (2005). Morocco. Footscray, VIC: Lonely Planet.

Buildings and structures in Ceuta
Portuguese colonial architecture in Spain